Premio al Pueblo Ejemplar de Asturias (in English: Exemplary Town of Asturias Award, in Asturian: Premiu al Pueblu Exemplar d'Asturies) is an award granted since 1990 Fundación Princesa de Asturias de Asturias to the Asturian village who stand out in "defense of their noblest values, their natural or ecological environment, their historical, cultural or artistic heritage. This award is conceived within the Princess of Asturias Awards.

List of winners

References

External links 
 Premio al Pueblo Ejemplar de Asturias

Asturias